John Prideaux (by 1520 – 1558), of Upton Pyne, Devon and the Inner Temple, London, was an English Member of Parliament for Plymouth  in 1547 and Devon in April 1554.

References

Members of the Parliament of England (pre-1707) for Devon
1558 deaths
English MPs 1547–1552
Members of the Parliament of England for Plymouth
English MPs 1554
Members of the Inner Temple
Year of birth uncertain